Radio Voice of the Gospel (RVOG) was a Lutheran World Federation international radio station based in the Ethiopian capital Addis Ababa, starting in 1963.

History 
Radio Voice of the Gospel was the brainchild of Norwegian missionary Dr. Sigurd Aske. It had two '100 kW shortwave transmitters, which could reach much of Africa and Asia. It also had a medium wave transmitter serving Addis Ababa. It broadcast in English, French, and a number of African and Asian languages.

Programming 
Many of Radio Voice of the Gospel programs were compiled in nine regional studios in the countries to which they were broadcast in 19 different languages. It aimed to be more general than many church-owned stations, as it broadcast news largely based on Reuters, as well as drama and other features. The staff were international and ecumenical. The news staff was highly respected for the accuracy of their news reporting.

Tensions and controversy 
Ethiopia was still under the Emperor Haile Selassie, and political activism and free speech were very limited in the country. It was therefore subject to some censorship and limitations, particularly on the local Amharic service. Censorship increased after the overthrow of Haile Selassie in 1974, when the Marxist government suppressed broadcasts that they considered counterrevolutionary.

Additionally, some of the donors came from the fundamentalist wing of the church and were clearly anxious their approach should dominate, particularly in such matters as creationism.

The Dergue took control of the country in 1974. The Provisional Military Governing Council of Ethiopia took over the radio station on March 12, 1977, apparently without compensation, and renamed it Radio Voice of Revolutionary Ethiopia to propagate Marxist ideas. It broadcast in Amharic, English, Arabic, and French.

References
 Evangelicals in Addis Ababa (1919–1991): With Special Reference to the Ethiopian Evangelical Church Mekane Yesus and the Addis Ababa Synod By Johannes Launhardt, 

Lutheranism in Ethiopia
Mass media in Addis Ababa